Jari Porttila (born 2 February 1960 in Helsinki) is a Finnish sports journalist, columnist, and reporter who works for television channel MTV3. He has also done commentating and sportsreading jobs. Before MTV3 he worked for newspapers Uusi Suomi and Iltalehti.

From 1990s to 2000s Porttila worked as a sportsreader in Tulosruutu, a sports news program on MTV3, and occasionally as a live-by-live commentator. Nowadays, Porttila is mainly known for his columns, in which he speaks out in a high-spirited way about the events in the world of sports. He has many contacts in the inner circle of sports. He focuses usually on skiing, ski jumping, Nordic combined, Formula One, and ice hockey, but is able to commentate on almost everything in sports.
Porttila has written six sports books about Finnish Olympic athletes. Most recently, he wrote the biography of Olympic champion Siiri Rantanen. Porttila is the editor-in-chief of maximusport.com and a commentator on the athletics diamond league at Cmore. He is also writing to Ilta-Sanomat.

References

External links
 Twitter
 Columns of Jari Porttila in MTV3 (in Finnish)
 "Finns pin Olympic hopes on cross-country women", CTV (quote from Porttila at 2010 Winter Olympics)

Writers from Helsinki
Finnish sports broadcasters
Living people
1952 births
Finnish columnists